The 2021 British Speedway Championship was the 61st edition of the British Speedway Championship. The final was held at the National Speedway Stadium and was won by Adam Ellis.

Results

The Final 
  National Speedway Stadium, Manchester
 16 August 2021

See also 
 British Speedway Championship

References 

British Speedway Championship
British
Speedway
British Speedway Championship
Sports competitions in Manchester